George Francis Burns III (born July 29, 1949) is an American professional golfer. Turning pro in 1975, Burns had four PGA Tour wins, 80 top-10 finishes and won several other tournaments at both the amateur and professional levels.

Burns was born in Brooklyn, New York. He was the eldest child of George Burns Jr, President of Smith Corona Typewriters and Durkee Foods, and Kathleen Marie Scott. He attended the University of Tennessee before transferring his freshman year to the University of Maryland where he played defensive end for one season before quitting football to focus solely on golf. He turned pro in 1975.

Burns won four PGA Tour events during that phase of his career. His first win came with Ben Crenshaw at the 1979 Walt Disney World National Team Championship in Orlando. The biggest win of his career came a year later at the Bing Crosby National Pro-Am. Burns had more than 70 top-10 finishes on the PGA Tour. His best finish in a major was at the 1981 U.S. Open where Burns held a three-shot lead going into the final round before finishing T2. Burns also had a T-5 at the 1977 British Open.

After reaching the age of 50 in 1999, Burns began play on the Senior PGA Tour (now known as the PGA Tour Champions). His best finish at that level is a T-9 at the 2000 Brickyard Classic. He lives and plays at Quail Ridge Country Club in Boynton Beach, Florida.

Amateur wins (8)
1972 Metropolitan Amateur, Monroe Invitational, Long Island Amateur
1973 Canadian Amateur Championship
1974 Azalea Invitational, Porter Cup, North and South Amateur, New York State Amateur

Professional wins (9)

PGA Tour wins (4)

PGA Tour playoff record (0–2)

European Tour wins (2)

European Tour playoff record (2–0)

Other wins (3)
1982 New York State Open, Panama Open
1988 Chrysler Team Championship (with Wayne Levi)

Results in major championships

CUT = missed the half-way cut (3rd round cut in 1978 Open Championship)
"T" indicates a tie for a place

Summary

Most consecutive cuts made – 5 (1981 U.S. Open – 1982 PGA)
Longest streak of top-10s – 2 (1975 Open Championship – 1976 Open Championship)

U.S. national team appearances
Amateur
Eisenhower Trophy: 1974 (winners)
Walker Cup: 1975 (winners)

See also
Fall 1975 PGA Tour Qualifying School graduates
1990 PGA Tour Qualifying School graduates

References

External links

American male golfers
Maryland Terrapins men's golfers
PGA Tour golfers
European Tour golfers
PGA Tour Champions golfers
European Senior Tour golfers
Golfers from New York (state)
Golfers from Florida
Sportspeople from Brooklyn
Sportspeople from West Palm Beach, Florida
1949 births
Living people